Guillaume Sabourin (born September 25, 1979) is a former professional footballer who played as a striker.

External links
Guillaume Sabourin profile at chamoisfc79.fr

1979 births
Living people
French footballers
Association football forwards
AS Saint-Étienne players
Chamois Niortais F.C. players
Ligue 2 players
Thouars Foot 79 players
Andrézieux-Bouthéon FC players
FC Aurillac Arpajon Cantal Auvergne players
US Saint-Georges players